Jean Boulet is a Canadian politician, who was elected to the National Assembly of Quebec in the 2018 provincial election. He represents the electoral district of Trois-Rivières as a member of the Coalition Avenir Québec and is the current Minister of Labour.

His sister is former Quebec Liberal MNA Julie Boulet.

A few days before the 2022 Quebec general election as CAQ Immigration and labour minister Boulet walked back from his past comments during a debate a few days before. Saying that 80% of immigrants go to Montreal, don't work, don't speak French or don't adhere to the values of Quebec.

Electoral Record

Cabinet posts

References

Living people
Coalition Avenir Québec MNAs
Members of the Executive Council of Quebec
People from Trois-Rivières
21st-century Canadian politicians
Year of birth missing (living people)